NGC 3842 is an elliptical galaxy in the constellation of Leo. It was discovered by William Herschel. It is notable for containing one of the largest black holes ever detected, reported to have a mass of 9.7 billion solar masses. It is around 330 million light-years distant from Earth.

NGC 3842 is the brightest member of the Leo Cluster.

References

External links
 

3842
36487
Leo Cluster
Elliptical galaxies
6704
Leo (constellation)